Awarapan is a 2007 Indian Hindi-language neo-noir action film directed by Mohit Suri and written by Shagufta Rafique, from a story by Mahesh Bhatt and produced by Mukesh Bhatt. It stars Emraan Hashmi, Shriya Saran, Mrinalini Sharma, and Ashutosh Rana. In the film, gangster Shivam Pandit (Hashmi) is ordered by his boss Bharat Malik (Rana) to watch over Reema (Sharma), Malik's secret Pakistani mistress.  

An uncredited remake of the South Korean film A Bittersweet Life, Awarapan draws from neo-noir and action thriller tropes. 

Awarapan was theatrically released in India and worldwide on 29 June 2007. Despite receiving positive reviews from critics, it was a commercial failure, but eventually came to be regarded as one of Hashmi's best works. The film was praised for the cast performance (especially Hashmi's performance), musical scores, songs, action sequences, plot and dialogues. But the film got less runtime due to excessive and brutal violence in the film.

Plot 
 
Shivam is a heartbroken and introvert atheist, gangster, and right-hand man of Bharat Malik, a criminal gangster who is also a businessman who runs a chain of hotels in Hong Kong. Shivam is given the responsibility of one of these hotels, which he bears capably and well, making it much more successful than Malik's other hotels. Malik holds Shivam in the highest esteem due to Shivam's loyalty, reliability, and business acumen, and treats him like an adored son whom he entrusts with almost everything - more so than his biological son Ronnie. This is the cause of much jealousy on Ronnie's part against Shivam, but due to Malik's outspoken support for Shivam, Ronnie does not dare to openly oppose him. Shivam has a very close childhood friend, Kabir, who assists him with everything. Meanwhile, Malik's brother Rajan and Rajan's spoilt son Munna nurture a grudge against Shivam because of Shivam's repeated conflicts with Munna.

One day, Malik asks Shivam to keep an eye on his young mistress Reema, whom he suspects of having an affair with someone else, while he is away on a brief business trip. Reema is a young Pakistani girl, devout Muslim, and victim of sex trafficking, whom Malik had "bought" in the Bangkok flesh market. If Reema is found cheating on Malik, then Shivam has to inform him immediately.

In Shivam's interactions with Reema, he recalls his lost love, Aliyah, in a series of flashbacks. Aliyah was a devout Muslim whom Shivam had met by chance in the marketplace one day. The duo eventually fell in love, but when her father saw them together, he wrathfully confronted them, reprimanding Aliyah physically. He also exposed Shivam's gangster background to a shocked Aliyah, leading to Shivam's instantly offering her father his gun, saying that he was willing to let go of everything, start anew, and legitimately provide for Aliyah if he is allowed to be with her. Aliyah's father recovers from his initial surprise quickly and shoots at Shivam with the gun, who ducks to avoid the bullet. The bullet hits Aliyah instead, killing her and temporarily driving Shivam over the edge. A feeling of guilt and sorrow at Aliyah having died because he tried to save his own life remains with Shivam hereafter. Aliyah's father instantly commits suicide when he realizes what he has done.

Shivam discovers one night that Reema has a secret boyfriend named Bilal, who convinces her to run away with him back to Pakistan. Shivam informs Malik, who orders Reema's elimination. However, when he confronts the couple to eliminate them, she dares him to shoot her, claiming that freedom is her right, requesting mercy "for God's sake". Shivam is reminded of Aliyah's religious mannerisms, which bear a strong resemblance to Reema's, and is unable to shoot her, leaving her alive. Malik tries to reach Shivam, who severs contact with the former, leading to Malik finding out about his disobedience.

Shivam plans to quickly run away from Hong Kong back to India with Kabir, who is extremely unwilling to do so. Eventually, he betrays Shivam to Malik, whose regard for Kabir goes up. Malik has Shivam captured and orders Ronnie to torture Shivam until he agrees to kill Reema when Shivam refuses to do so even after Malik offers him a second chance. Malik is now genuinely hurt and sorrowful at what he perceives as Shivam's betrayal, and he hands over Shivam's responsibilities in the business to Kabir. Malik makes up the old feud with Rajan and Munna and merges their gangs and businesses, with Malik demanding that Shivam be brought before him alive so that Malik can kill him personally. This occurs in Kabir's presence, who is bitterly penitent to the point of not wishing to live any more over his betrayal of Shivam.

Shivam manages to escape Ronnie and seeks refuge in the monastery of a monk whom he had once set free from certain death. He recovers from his injuries, and reminded of Aliyah and her belief in freedom, decides to not continue running all his life to save his own skin, but to "fulfill someone else's dreams" - namely, unite Bilal and Reema and send them to Pakistan. He manages to save Bilal from Malik's henchmen, led by Kabir, whom Shivam still trusts and regards as his best friend, who tearfully reiterates that he is ready to die for Shivam, as he always was. Kabir takes Bilal to the monastery, where arrangements are made to ship Bilal and Reema to Lahore.

Shivam tracks Reema, kills Rajan, and refuses to divulge where she is. He tricks Munna into revealing Malik's plans regarding Reema, which are to sell her to the person who "enjoys" her the most. Munna tells Shivam everything about it, including the location, believing him to be crippled by his wounds and is immediately killed by Shivam upon realizing that is not the case. Shivam finds Reema and Malik, who is madly enraged at Shivam's standing against him, when he had cared for Shivam so much, deriding Shivam's new belief in God and freedom. Shivam kills Malik and escapes with Reema to the shipping docks, where Bilal is waiting. Kabir shows up to fight Malik's men and buy Shivam time, and he is brutally murdered in the process. Bilal manages to force a reluctant Reema to escape to the ship, who is hesitant to leave Shivam behind. Ronnie and his men arrive, and a gunfight follows killing everyone including Shivam and Ronnie. Shivam finally reunites with Aliyah in heaven. The movie ends with Reema in a conference in Pakistan, where she tells her story of the "awara" who sacrificed his life to save her, and incites those present to stand up for victims of trafficking.

Cast
 Ashutosh Rana as Bharat Daulat Malik: A crime lord and boss of Shivam who treats Shivam like his own son but gets betrayed and later killed by him.
 Emraan Hashmi as Shivam Pandit: The protagonist of the film, is an atheist gangster with a tragic past whose love has been murdered. He later gets reminded of his love's practices.
 Shriya Saran as Aaliyah: A Muslim Indian and Shivam's loved one who induces the idea of God and freedom into Shivam and was mistakenly murdered by her father due to Shivam's criminal life
 Mrinalini Sharma as Reema Ali Khan: A Pakistani girl who was forced into trafficking by some human trafficking people. Malik bought her from them and even asked Shivam to keep an eye on her.
 Shaad Randhawa as Kabir Bahl: Shivam's best friend since his childhood and business partner whom Shivam hands over the business responsibilities. He ultimately gets murdered.
 Rehan Khan as Bilal Najeem: Reema's secret boyfriend who plans to go to Pakistan with her.
 Ashish Vidyarthi as Rajan D. Malik: Malik's brother who ultimately gets killed by Shivam.
 Salil Acharya as Ronnie B. Malik: Malik's son who gets jealous of Shivam and then gets killed by him.
 Purab Kohli as Munna R. Malik: Rajan's son who confesses Shivam the truths and then gets killed by him.
 Atul Parchure as Siddharth Sood: A monk.

Production
Some scenes were shot in Lahore, making it one of the few Indian films to have been filmed in Pakistan. Other scenes were filmed in Hong Kong, Bangkok and Moscow.

Soundtrack

The music for the film was composed by Roxen (band) & Annie Khalid and were recreated in musical arrangements by Pritam. Some of the singers who have lent their voices for the album include Mustafa Zahid, Suzanne D'Mello, Rafaqat Ali Khan and Annie Khalid. The lyrics have been written by Sayeed Quadri, Asif Ali Baig and Annie Khalid. All the remix versions were produced by DJ Suketu and arranged by Aks.

Track listing

Release
Awarapan was released on 29 June 2007 all over India under the banner of Vishesh Films.

Reception
Taran Adarsh from Bollywood Hungama gave the film 3.5 stars out of 5 and praised the direction, music, dialogue and performances, while noting the film's excessive violence could act as a deterrent for several viewers. Rajeev Masand gave the film 3 stars out of 5 and felt the film had an "international look" owing to its action scenes and the Hong Kong skyline; he also praised the music and found the carnage sequences to have a "strange beauty". However, he criticized the slow pace, violence content and felt the film did not get to the characters' emotional core. Jaspreet Pandohar from BBC similarly gave the film 3 stars, describing it as an "engaging, albeit violent, drama" and praising Hashmi's performance, while feeling disappointed that more was not made of the issue of human trafficking.

On the other hand, Khalid Mohamed from Hindustan Times gave the film 2 stars out of 5 and criticized the slow pacing, violence, while praising Hashmi's performance and Pritam's music. Ajit N. from Rediff.com gave the film 1.5 stars out of 5 and felt Rana and Saran were wasted.

Notes

References

External links 
 

2007 films
2007 action drama films
2000s Hindi-language films
Films directed by Mohit Suri
Films featuring songs by Pritam
Films set in Bangkok
Films set in Hong Kong
Films set in Lahore
Films set in Pakistan
Films set in Punjab, Pakistan
Films shot in Hong Kong
Films shot in Lahore
Films shot in Moscow
Films shot in Punjab, Pakistan
Films shot in Pakistan
Films shot in Thailand
Indian action drama films
Indian remakes of South Korean films
India–Pakistan relations in popular culture
Indian romantic action films
Indian romantic drama films